Benjamin Seymour (ca 1806 – March 23, 1880) was a political figure in Canada West and a Conservative member of the Senate of Canada from 1867 to 1880.

He was born in Fredericksburgh Township in Upper Canada around 1806 and became a merchant in the town of Bath.

In 1844, he was elected to the 2nd Parliament of the Province of Canada representing the counties of  Lennox and Addington and he continued to serve in that role until 1854. He was appointed to the Legislative Council. In 1867, he was appointed to the Canadian Senate and died while still in office in 1880.

External links 
 

1880 deaths
Members of the Legislative Assembly of the Province of Canada from Canada West
Members of the Legislative Council of the Province of Canada
Conservative Party of Canada (1867–1942) senators
Canadian senators from Ontario
Year of birth uncertain